Coseano is a comune (municipality) in the Province of Udine in the Italian region Friuli-Venezia Giulia, located about  northwest of Trieste and about  west of Udine.

Coseano borders the following municipalities: Dignano, Flaibano, Mereto di Tomba, Rive d'Arcano, San Vito di Fagagna, Sedegliano.

Sports
A.S.D. G.S. Coseano is the local private football team, it's a private team whose president is businessman Stefano Di Bidino.

Twin towns
 Finale Ligure, Italy

References

Cities and towns in Friuli-Venezia Giulia